James Brydges, 1st Duke of Chandos,  (6 January 16739 August 1744) was an English landowner and politician who sat in the English and British House of Commons from 1698 until 1714, when he succeeded to the peerage as Baron Chandos, and vacated his seat in the House of Commons to sit in the House of Lords. He was subsequently created Earl of Carnarvon, and then Duke of Chandos in 1719.

Early life

Brydges was born at Dewsall, Herefordshire, the fourth, but eldest surviving son of James Brydges, 8th Baron Chandos and his wife Elizabeth Barnard, daughter of Sir Henry Barnard, merchant of St Dunstan-in-the-East, London, and of Bridgnorth, Shropshire.  He was educated at Westminster School in 1686, and at New College, Oxford, from 1690 to 1692. He was at the Wolfenbüttel academy from 1692 to 1694 and in 1694 he was elected to the Royal Society.

Political career
Brydges was a Freeman of Ludlow in 1697, and was returned unopposed as Member of Parliament for Hereford at the 1698 English general election. In 1700 he was a member of the Old East India Company. He was returned as MP for Hereford in contests at the two general elections of 1701 and unopposed at the 1702 English general election. From 1702 to 1703 he was Commissioner of public accounts and was a member of the council of the Lord High Admiral from 1703 to April 1705. He was returned unopposed at Hereford again at the 1705 English general election. From April 1705 Brydges was paymaster-general of the forces abroad during the War of the Spanish Succession. At the 1708 British general election, he was returned for Truro, and in a contest for Hereford, and opted to sit at Hereford. In 1710 he was admitted to the Inner Temple. He was returned in a contest for Hereford at the 1710 British general election. In 1711 he was a commissioner for taking subscriptions to the South Sea Company. He was returned unopposed at the 1713 British general election.

Brydges succeeded his father as 9th Baron Chandos on 16 October 1714, and was created Earl of Carnarvon on 19 October 1714. He took up the role of joint clerk of hanaper in reversion in November 1714. In 1718 he became governor of the Levant Company until 1736. He was created Duke of Chandos on 29 April 1719. In 1721 he became a governor of Charterhouse. He was Lord Lieutenant of the counties of Hereford and Radnor and steward of crown manors for Radnorshire. He became a member of the Privy Council on 11 November 1721. He was Chancellor of the University of St Andrews (where he established the Chandos Chair of Medicine and Anatomy in 1721)  from 1724 for the rest of his life.  In 1737 he was appointed ranger of Enfield chase 1737. He became one of the founding governors of the Foundling Hospital in 1739.

Wealth
Brydges amassed great wealth through his public offices. The ethics of his financial operations were called into question at the time, but it was generally accepted that people could profit from public office. He continued to engage in speculative investments after being made Duke of Chandos in 1719, but lost money in the South Sea Bubble and the York Buildings Company.

Brydges built a magnificent house "at vast expense" at Cannons, an estate near Edgware in Middlesex. There he ran through several architects prominent in the English Baroque. He began in 1713 with William Talman, whom he dismissed in favour of John James in 1714; James had partly executed his designs before James Gibbs succeeded him in 1715. Howard Colvin (ref) concludes that the south and east elevations, as well as the chapel, were the designs of Gibbs. Brydges dismissed Gibbs in 1719, and completed the house under the supervision of John Price and, in 1723–25, Edward Shepherd. Cannons was demolished in 1747. On its site, now incorporated in Greater London, is Canons Park.

Brydges is said to have considered building a private road across his own lands between this place and his never completed house in Cavendish Square, London, probably also designed by Gibbs.

Handel and Pope

The Duke is chiefly remembered on account of his connections with George Frideric Handel, for whom he acted as a major patron, and with Alexander Pope, seen as having slandered Chandos in one of his poems. He served as an early patron to his relative George Rodney, later to become famous for his victory at the Battle of the Saintes, during his early career in the navy.

Chandos and Handel
Before Chandos was made a duke, he employed the young composer George Frideric Handel over a period of two years, 1717–18. Handel lived at Cannons, where he composed his oratorio Esther and his pastoral opera Acis and Galatea. Handel also composed the Chandos Anthems for his patron; they were first performed at the parish church of St Lawrence, Little Stanmore, with the composer playing the organ of 1716 which has survived there to the present day.

In 1719 Chandos was one of the main subscribers in the Royal Academy of Music, not the well-known conservatoire of that name but a corporation that produced baroque opera on stage in London.

Chandos and Pope
Alexander Pope, who in his Moral Essays (Epistle to the Earl of Burlington) was alleged to have ridiculed Cannons under the guise of Timon's Villa, later referred to the Duke in the line, "Thus gracious Chandos is belov'd at sight"; but Jonathan Swift, less complimentary, called him "a great  with every court". The poet was caricatured by Hogarth for his supposed servility to Chandos. Pope published a denial of his alleged satire of the Duke's estate, in which he said that the estate of the poem "differs in every particular from" Chandos's. According to Pope biographer Maynard Mack, Chandos thereafter assured Pope by letter that he believed him, i.e. that the Epistle to Burlington was not intended as a satire of his estate. The malice, indeed, was on the part not of Pope, but of the insinuators and slanderers, the hack writers whom Pope had ridiculed as dunces in his Dunciad; Mack calls the affair a "falsehood of considerable damage to [Pope's] character".

Marriages and issue
Chandos was married three times. On 2 February 1695, he married Mary Lake, daughter of Sir Thomas Lake, of Cannons, Middlesex and his wife Rebecca Langham.

The marriage produced two sons who survived childhood:
 John Brydges, Marquess of Carnarvon (15 January 17038 April 1727)
 Henry Brydges, 2nd Duke of Chandos (1 February 170828 November 1771).

His first wife Mary died on 15 September 1712. He then married Cassandra Willoughby the daughter of Francis Willoughby and Emma Barnard on 4 August 1713.

His second wife Cassandra died on 18 July 1735. On 18 April 1736, he married Lydia Catherine Van Hatten, the daughter of John Van Hatten and Lydia Davall.

Death and legacy
Chandos died in Cannons on 9 August 1744). Chandos and several members of his family (his first two wives) are buried at the Chandos Mausoleum at the Church of St Lawrence, Whitchurch Lane, Little Stanmore, London. His third wife, who survived him, moved to Shaw House, Berkshire where she died in 1750.

Mrs. Elizabeth Montagu in a letter, dated Sandleford, 21 December 1750 to Miss Anstey, wrote: "My dear Miss Anstey, ... A little before I went to London I lost my very good neighbour, the Dutchess of Chandos, a stroke of the palsy carried her off in a few days: her bodily pains were great, but her mind felt the serenity that gilds the evening of a virtuous life. She quitted the world with that decent fare-well which people take of it, who rather consider it as a place in which they are to impart good than to enjoy it Her character has made a great impression on me, as I think her a rare instance that age could not make conceited and stiff, nor retirement discontented, nor virtue inflexible and severe..."

In a letter to Mrs. Donnellan dated Sandleford, 30 December 1750, Mrs. Montagu continued, "My rich neighbours are dull, and my poor ones are miserable ... The Dutchess of Chandos is greatly missed by the poor in this rigorous season. There is a family at Donnington Castle who are very generous and charitable, but nothing can entirely avail in a part of the world where manufacture decays; daily labour must give daily bread; occasional alms like medicine to the diseased, but can hardly procure constant health. To make the poor happy one must make them industrious..."

Succession 
Chandos was succeeded by his son, Henry Brydges, 2nd Duke of Chandos, who found the estate so encumbered by debt that a demolition sale of Cannons was held in 1747, which dispersed furnishings and structural elements, with the result that elements of Cannons survive in several English country houses, notably Lord Foley's house, Witley Court at Great Witley, and its chapel (ceiling paintings by Bellucci and stained glass by Joshua Price of York after designs by Francesco Sleter). The pulpit and other fittings from Chandos's chapel were reinstalled in the parish church at Fawley, Buckinghamshire, by John Freeman of Fawley Court.

The 1st Duke's sister, The Hon. Mary Brydges, married Theophilus Leigh. They were the great-grandparents of Jane Austen.

Notes

References
 Howard Colvin, 1995 (3rd ed.). A Biographical Dictionary of British Architects, 1600–1840 (Yale University Press)
 R. H. Nichols and F.A. Wray, The History of the Foundling Hospital (London: Oxford University Press, 1935)
 Johnson, Joan. Excellent Cassandra: The Life and Times of the Duchess of Chandos. Alan Sutton Publishing Limited, Gloucester, England 1981.
 Trew, Peter. Rodney & the Breaking of the Line. Pen & Sword, 2006.

Further reading 

 Joan Johnson, 1989. Princely Chandos: James Brydges 1674–1744
 C. H. and M. I. Collins Baker, 1949. The Life and Circumstances of James Brydges,: First Duke of Chandos, Patron of the Liberal Arts (Oxford University: Clarendon Press). Still the standard work on Chandos and Cannons
 (Henry St. John, Lord Bolingbroke) 1935. Letters of Henry St. John to James Brydges (Harvard University Press)
 John Robert Robinson, The princely Chandos, a memoir of James Brydges, paymaster-general to the forces abroad during the most brilliant part of the Duke of Marlborough's military ... afterwards the first Duke of Chandos

External links 
 
 The Rise and Fall of Henry James Bridges, First Duke of Chandos, for whom Handel composed the Chandos Anthems, an interesting illustrated article (which appears to have some minor inaccuracies, e.g. the statement that Francesco Scarlatti worked at Cannons).
 Six Chandos Anthems, program notes to a 2-CD recording.
 The Dukes of Chandos

|-

|-

Alumni of New College, Oxford
James
Chancellors of the University of St Andrews
1
Fellows of the Royal Society
Lord-Lieutenants of Herefordshire
Lord-Lieutenants of Radnorshire
Brydges, James
Members of the Privy Council of Great Britain
People educated at Westminster School, London
People from Edgware
People from Stanmore
1673 births
1744 deaths
English MPs 1698–1700
English MPs 1701
English MPs 1701–1702
English MPs 1702–1705
English MPs 1705–1707
British MPs 1707–1708
British MPs 1708–1710
British MPs 1710–1713
Lords of the Manor of Totteridge
Burials at the Chandos Mausoleum
Paymasters of the Forces
Lords of the Admiralty